Yaqub ibn Ishaq ibn Ibrahim (Arabic: يَعْقُوب ابْنُ إِسْحَٰق ابْنُ إِبْرَاهِيم, literally: "Jacob, son of Isaac, son of Abraham" ; also later Israil, Arabic: إِسْرَآئِیل [israaeel]; Classical/Quranic Arabic: إِسْرَآءِیْل [israaeel]), also known as Jacob, is a prophet in Islam. He is acknowledged as a patriarch of Islam. Muslims believe that he preached the same monotheistic faith as did his forefathers: Abraham (Ibrahim), Ishmael (Ismail) and Isaac (Ishaq).

Jacob is mentioned sixteen times in the Quran. Two further references to Isra'il are believed to be mentions of Jacob.  In the majority of these references, Jacob is mentioned alongside fellow Hebrew prophets and patriarchs as an ancient and pious prophet who stayed in the "company of the elect". Muslims hold that Jacob was the son of Isaac and that he preached the Oneness of God throughout his life. As in Christianity and Judaism, Islam holds that Jacob had twelve sons, who would go on to father the Twelve Tribes of Israel. Jacob plays a significant role in the story of his son, Joseph (Yūsuf). The Quran further makes it clear that God made a covenant with Jacob and Jacob was made a faithful leader by God's command. His grandfather (Ibrahim), father (Ishaq), uncle (Ismail), son (Yusuf) and himself are all prophets of Islam.

In the Quran 
Jacob is mentioned by name in the Quran sixteen times. Although many of these verses praise him rather than recount an instance from his narrative, the Quran nonetheless records several significant events from his life.  Muslim tradition and literature<ref>Qisas Al-Anbiya (Stories of the Prophets), Ibn Kathir/Kisa'i, Story of Isaac and Jacob</ref> the earliest event involving Jacob in the Quran is that of the angels (malāʾikah) giving "glad tidings" to Abraham and Sarah of the future birth of a prophetic son by the name of Isaac as well as a prophetic grandson by the name of Jacob. The Quran states:

The Quran also mentions that Abraham taught the faith of pure monotheism to his sons, Ishmael and Isaac, as well as Jacob. The Quran records Abraham telling Ishmael, Isaac and Jacob: "Oh my sons! God hath chosen the Faith for you; then die not except in the Faith of Islam." The Quran also mentions the gifts given to Jacob as well as the strength of his faith, which became stronger as he became older. The Quran mentions that Jacob was "guided"; given "knowledge"; "inspired"; and was given a "tongue of truthfulness to be heard". The Quran later states the following regarding Jacob:

 Jacob and his sons 
Jacob's next significant mention in the Quran is in the narrative of the surah Yusuf. Joseph's story in the Quran opens with a dream that Joseph had one night, after which he ran to his father Jacob, saying: "Behold! Joseph said to his father: "O my father! I did see eleven planets and the sun and the moon: I saw them prostrate themselves to me!" " Jacob's face filled with delight at what he had heard from the young Joseph, and the ageing prophet immediately understood what the dream meant. Jacob could foresee that his son would grow up to be the next prophet in the line of Abraham and it would be Joseph who would keep the message of Islam alive in the coming years. Jacob's older sons, however, felt that their father loved Joseph and Benjamin, Jacob's youngest son, more than them. Jacob knew about their jealousy and warned the young Joseph about it. Joseph's ten older brothers then decided to kill him. As the Quran narrates their discussion:

One of the brothers (usually understood to be Reuben) however, felt that instead of slaying Joseph(Yusuf) they should instead drop him into a well, so that a caravan may come and pick him up. Thus, they asked their father whether they could take the young Joseph out to play with them, on the condition that they would keep watch over him. Although Jacob feared that a dhi’b (wolf) would devour his son, the rebellious older sons forcefully took Joseph away and threw him into the well. When the sons came back to Jacob that night, they pretended to weep and they further told him that the wolf had devoured Joseph. To trick their father, they stained Joseph's(Yusuf) shirt with false blood, but Jacob, who had been gifted with knowledge, knew this was a false concoction that they had devised. Although Jacob did worry over the loss of Joseph, he remained steadfast to God throughout his grief. As the years passed, the young Joseph grew up into a man in Egypt; Jacob, meanwhile, was back at home in Canaan, where his sons would constantly bother him about his repeated praying to God for the return of Joseph(Yusuf). Although Jacob frequently complained to God it was never for God's doings, but out of the distractions of his own mind and his occasional breaking out of the bounds of patience he had set for himself. He constantly ignored the wicked taunting of his sons and would forgive them and tried to give them sound advice. One day, Jacob decided to send his sons on an errand, telling them to go to Egypt in search of Joseph and Benjamin. His sons, for the first time, listened to him and departed for Egypt. When one of Jacob's sons returned to Canaan with the good news of Joseph and Benjamin in Egypt, he came with a shirt that Joseph had given him, which he had told him to cast over their father's face, to remove Jacob's blindness and grief. Thus, the son followed the instructions and did as Joseph said, restoring Jacob's physical and mental vision.

Once Jacob's sight had been restored, the whole family began their trek to Egypt, to meet Joseph and the other sons again. Once they arrived, the father and son met each other with great love and were reunited in peace once again. The now powerful Joseph provided a home for his parents with himself and, as the Quran says, raised them high on a 'throne of dignity'. It was now that the whole family, together, could turn to God through the prophetic offices of both Jacob and Joseph.

 Jacob's last advice to his people 
The whole of the Children of Israel were called to bow down to faith in Islam (Submission to God) before Jacob died. Jacob wanted to make sure that his children die only in Islam, and, therefore, took one last promise from them. When he asked them who they would worship after his death, they replied that they would continue in Islam and bow down to and worship God. Although the death-bed scene relates to Jewish tradition, and mentioned in the Book of Genesis, the Quran mentions it to emphasize the notion that Abraham, Isaac, Ishmael, and Jacob were all Muslims, as they bowed down in full faith to God and God alone. The Quran narrates:

 The legacy of Jacob 
Jacob is very special in Islam for carrying on the legacy left by his forefathers. Muslims believe God bestowed His utmost grace upon Jacob and chose him to be among the most exalted men. The Quran frequently mentions Jacob as a man of might and vision and stresses he was of the company of the good and elect. As the Quran says:

Ali ibn Abi Talib, when asked about the prophets who were bestowed special names, narrates in Hadith that Ya'qub ibn Ishaq was known by his people as Isra'il.

Instances in the Bible involving Jacob wrestling with an angel are not mentioned in the Quran, but are discussed in Muslim commentaries, as is the vision of Jacob's Ladder. Jacob tricking Isaac into blessing him by impersonating his twin, Esau, is also not in the Quran, but is in Muslim commentaries.

Muslims, who do believe Jacob was a great patriarch, stress the belief that Jacob's main importance lay in his great submission to God and his firm faith in the right religion. As a patriarch, Jacob, alongside Abraham, may be the most fruitful according to tradition. From his twelve sons were to come many other great prophets, including Jonah (Yunus), David (Dawud), Solomon (Sulayman) and Jesus (Isa).

Tomb of Jacob

Jacob is believed by Muslims and Jews alike to be buried in the Cave of the Patriarchs (known by Muslims as the Sanctuary of Abraham). The compound, located in the city of Hebron, is the second holiest site for Jews (after the Temple Mount in Jerusalem), and is also venerated by Christians and Muslims, both of whom have traditions that maintain that the site is the burial place of three Biblical couples: Abraham and Sarah, Isaac and Rebecca, and Jacob and Leah.

 References to Jacob in the Quran 
Food refusal: 

 See also 
 Biblical and Quranic narratives
 Qisas Al-Anbiya (Stories of The Prophets)
 Yakub (Nation of Islam) Further reading 
 
 The Concise Encyclopedia Of Islam'', Cyril Glasse

References 

Jacob
Hebrew Bible prophets of the Quran